The Substitute is a 2007 Danish science fiction horror film directed by Ole Bornedal, and starring Paprika Steen.

Plot 
The story takes place in a small village in Denmark where an alien comes to Earth to learn about human emotions, but instead is thwarted by a young boy and his friends, who find out that she is part of an intergalactic expedition to collect specimens across the universe. It's up to Carl and his friends to save their town and the world. They try to tell their parents, but all of them scoff at the idea that their children would make up lies about their teacher.

Cast 
 Paprika Steen – Ulla Harms
 Ulrich Thomsen – Jesper Osböll
  – Carl
 Nikolaj Falkenberg-Klok – Phillip
 Emma Juel Justesen – Rikke
 Mollie Maria Gilmartin – Lotte
 Sofie Gråbøl – Carl's mother

References

External links 
 
 The Substitute at Nordic Fantasy

2007 films
Danish science fiction films
Films directed by Ole Bornedal
Films scored by Marco Beltrami
2000s Danish-language films